James Wild may refer to:

James Wild (politician) (born 1977), British Conservative Party politician
James Wild (rugby league), rugby league player for Wakefield Trinity
James William Wild (1814–1892), British architect

See also 
James Wilde (disambiguation)